

445001–445100 

|-bgcolor=#f2f2f2
| colspan=4 align=center | 
|}

445101–445200 

|-bgcolor=#f2f2f2
| colspan=4 align=center | 
|}

445201–445300 

|-bgcolor=#f2f2f2
| colspan=4 align=center | 
|}

445301–445400 

|-id=308
| 445308 Volov ||  || Panayot Volov (c. 1850–1876), a Bulgarian revolutionary, who organized and lead the 1876 insurrection against the Ottoman Empire. || 
|}

445401–445500 

|-bgcolor=#f2f2f2
| colspan=4 align=center | 
|}

445501–445600 

|-bgcolor=#f2f2f2
| colspan=4 align=center | 
|}

445601–445700 

|-bgcolor=#f2f2f2
| colspan=4 align=center | 
|}

445701–445800 

|-bgcolor=#f2f2f2
| colspan=4 align=center | 
|}

445801–445900 

|-id=818
| 445818 Ronbeck ||  || Ron Beck (born 1955) is an American engineer who specializes in the operations of ground data systems for space missions including Voyager, the Infrared Astronomical Satellite, the Two Micron All-Sky Survey, the Spitzer Space Telescope, the Wide-field Infrared Survey Explorer, and the Zwicky Transient Facility. || 
|}

445901–446000 

|-id=917
| 445917 Ola ||  || Aleksandra Sufa (born 1998) and Aleksandra Kusiak (born 1957), a friend and the mother of Polish co-discoverer Michal Kusiak, respectively. Ola is a diminutive of name Aleksandra. || 
|}

References 

445001-446000